Vetluga (Vütla) is a river in the Kirov Oblast, Kostroma Oblast, Mari El Republic and Nizhny Novgorod Oblast of Russia. It is a left tributary of the Volga. Their confluence is near Kozmodemyansk. The river is navigable. Its largest tributaries are Neya, Bolshaya Kaksha, Usta and Yuronga from the left and Vokhma and Lyunda from the right. The town Vetluga is situated on the river.

References 

Rivers of Kirov Oblast
Rivers of Kostroma Oblast
Rivers of Mari El
Rivers of Nizhny Novgorod Oblast